Congocharax is a genus of distichodontid fishes from tropical Africa, with these currently described species:
 Congocharax olbrechtsi (Poll, 1954)
 Congocharax spilotaenia (Boulenger, 1912)

References
 

Distichodontidae
Fish of Africa
Taxa named by Hubert Matthes